The Serbian football league system is a series of interconnected leagues for association football clubs in Serbia. The system has a hierarchical format with promotion and relegation between leagues at different levels.

Format
The number of teams promoted between leagues or divisions varies, and promotion is usually contingent on meeting criteria set by the higher league, especially concerning appropriate facilities and finances. The top two levels contain one league each. Below this, the levels have progressively more parallel leagues, which each cover progressively smaller geographic areas. The top two leagues are under direct jurisdiction of the Serbian Football Association. From the 3rd level on, divided geographically into 4 leagues, the leagues are under the jurisdiction of one of the 4 football association subdivisions, Belgrade, East, Vojvodina and West.

In the top of the pyramid is the Serbian SuperLiga containing 16 clubs as of 2010–11 season. Below the SuperLiga is found the Serbian First League containing 18 clubs. The last 4 are relegated into the Srpska Liga, the 3rd level, divided into 4 leagues Serbian League Belgrade, Serbian League East, Serbian League Vojvodina and Serbian League West every one of them containing 16 clubs. Until 2006 the clubs from Montenegro were also included, and the league's structure below and including 3rd level was slightly different because of it. The current Serbian league system is partially inherited from the pre-1992 Yugoslav league system, being back then the current 3rd tier, the Serbian League, unified and it was one of the 6 republic leagues forming the 4th level in the Yugoslav league pyramid, being under First and Second Federal League and Inter-republican Leagues.

Present system

Women
Until 2013 only two levels existed. For the 2013/14 season a new first level, called the Super liga was created.

References

External links
 SuperLiga official website.
 First League official website.
 Serbian League Belgrade (FSB) official website.
 Serbian League Vojvodina (FSV) official website.
 Serbian League West (FSRZS) official website.
 Serbian League East (FSRIS) official website.
 Fudbalska Zona Zone Leagues unofficial website.
 Football Association of Kruševac District (FSGKŠ) official website.
 Football Association of Pomoravlje District (FSPO) official website.
 Football Association of Rasin region (FS Rasin District) official website.

 
Serbia